Samuel Balmer (born May 1, 1968) is a former Swiss professional ice hockey defenceman who last played for EHC Basel in Switzerland's National League A.

Balmer has participated as a member of the Swiss national team in numerous international tournaments, including the 1992 Winter Olympics.

References

External links

1968 births
Living people
EHC Basel players
EV Zug players
HC Davos players
HC Fribourg-Gottéron players
HC Lugano players
Ice hockey players at the 1992 Winter Olympics
EHC Kloten players
Olympic ice hockey players of Switzerland
SCL Tigers players
Swiss ice hockey defencemen